Leonard Harris (born November 27, 1960 in McKinney, Texas) is a former National Football League wide receiver and kick returner who played for the Houston Oilers (1987–1993) and Atlanta Falcons (1994). He also played for the Denver Gold of the United States Football League.

1960 births
Living people
People from McKinney, Texas
American football wide receivers
American football return specialists
Texas Tech Red Raiders football players
Tampa Bay Buccaneers players
Houston Oilers players
Atlanta Falcons players
Denver Gold players
African-American players of American football
Players of American football from Texas
National Football League replacement players
21st-century African-American people
20th-century African-American sportspeople